PNA Prefecto Fique (GC-27) is a Mantilla-class patrol boat in service with the Argentine Naval Prefecture, built at the Empresa Nacional Bazán shipyards and commissioned in 1983. The vessel is named after Luis Pedro Fique, a former commander of the “Prefectura de Ushuaia” of the PNA; she is the first ship of this service with this name.

Design 
Prefecto Fique is one of five Mantilla-class patrol boats ordered by the Argentine Naval Prefecture (PNA) in 1981, corresponding to the coast guard cutter “Halcon II” type, designed and build by the Spanish Empresa Nacional Bazán shipyard. The design is optimised for long range open seas patrols, for prolonged periods of time away from port.

Prefecto Fique has a steel hull and superstructure, with a single mast atop, behind the bridge. She is powered by two Bazán-MTU 16V-956-TB91 marine diesel engines of 2500 kW each (maximum intermittent power 3000 kW), driving two Variable-pitch propellers; with a maximum speed of 18kn (19kn at maximum intermittent power). The design has a maximum range of 3650 nautical miles at a cruise speed of 16kn.

She has 3 electrical generators of 185Kva each, powering a varied array of systems: controls and communications system that integrates with other PNA air and surface assets; navigation radar; echosound; direction finder; and helicopter navigation control.

Prefecto Fique is equipped with two water cannons for firefighting, anti-contamination gear, active stabilizers and a retractable hangar and landing pad with support facilities for an Alouette-sized helicopter. She is armed with a single 40mm L/70 Bofors dual-purpose autocannon in a position at the front of the bridge.

History 

Prefecto Fique was ordered by the Argentine Naval Prefecture (PNA) in 1981 as part of the five-ship Mantilla-class, composed by the patrol boats GC-24 to GC-28. She was built in 1981-83 by the Spanish Empresa Nacional Bazán shipyard. She was launched in February 1982, completed in 1983, and left El Ferrol, Spain, arriving in Buenos Aires on 15 October 1983. She was commissioned on 18 November 1983 and assigned to the Coast Guard Service ( Servicio de Buques Guardacostas}).

In November 1983 she sails on her first patrol of the Argentine Sea. In 1997 is assigned to the port of Caleta Olivia, reporting to “Prefectura Comodoro Rivadavia”.

As of 2016, she is based at Caleta Olivia.

Footnotes

See also 
 Z-28 class patrol boat

References

Notes

Bibliography

Other sources

Further reading

External links 
  - Servicio de Buques Guardacostas – Prefectura Naval Argentina, oficial website (accessed 2016-11-26)

Prefecto Fique
Patrol vessels of Argentina
Ships built in Spain
1983 ships